Wartburg College is a private Lutheran liberal arts college in Waverly, Iowa. It has an additional campus, Wartburg West, in Denver, Colorado.

History 
Wartburg College was founded in 1852 in Saginaw, Michigan, by Georg M. Grossmann, a native of Neuendettelsau, Bavaria. Grossmann was sent by Pastor Wilhelm Löhe to establish a pastor training school for German immigrants.  The location of the college moved many times between Illinois and Iowa until permanently settling in Waverly in 1935. Also in 1935, St. Paul Luther College of the Phalen Park neighborhood of Saint Paul, Minnesota merged into Wartburg College.

The college is named after Wartburg Castle in Eisenach, Germany, where Martin Luther was protected during the stormy days of the Reformation. Student and alumni groups often travel to the castle, and the Wartburg Choir has performed in the castle several times. Waverly and Eisenach are sister towns, and they often swap foreign exchange students. The college is proud of its German heritage, and celebrates an annual student-declared one-day holiday Outfly, a deliberately mistaken translation of the German noun Ausflug. This tradition likely started in the fall of 1982, as faculty minutes show an unplanned outing on October 6. Another German element of campus life is the granite inscription on the Chapel: "Ein feste Burg ist unser Gott", which English-speaking Lutherans sing as "A Mighty Fortress is Our God".

Campus buildings are named after places and people in Wartburg's history, including Grossmann, Luther, Saginaw, Galena, etc. The college is nearing the end of a long-term effort to unify the architectural appearance of the campus, with new music, library, stadium, cafeteria, and science buildings over the past 15 years. An array of skywalks and building corridors now allows students to walk from one end of campus to the other without having to go outside.

In 2008 the Wartburg-Waverly Sports and Wellness Center, an indoor athletic complex co-sponsored by the city of Waverly, opened. The new center includes a performance arena, an indoor track, and natatorium. It replaced Knights Gymnasium, the longtime home of Wartburg basketball and volleyball, as well as the Physical Education Center which formerly adjoined the old gym.

The longstanding rivalry between Luther College in Decorah, Iowa, and Wartburg College has produced colorful moments over several years. The origins of the rivalry are vague. Stories of pranks date back to the 1940s. The rivalry has, for the most part, been characterized by fun and good sportsmanship. The rivalry rose to new heights in October 1996, when two clever Wartburg cross-country runners rented a light plane, flew to Decorah, and dropped leaflets on the Luther campus. The incident was reported in every major newspaper in Iowa, got national mention on the Fox network and made Rolling Stone magazine's list of the most memorable college pranks of 1996-1997. The creativity in the rivalry continued when student staff members of the college radio station, KWAR, secretly entered a float in the Luther College Homecoming Parade.  The staff members decorated the float as an environmental club - the Organization of Nature Enthusiasts - from Luther College.  In front of judges stand, the float quickly changed colors from blue and white to orange and black.  The float continued all the way through town and onto Luther's campus, with numerous Wartburg students joining the procession from the crowd as the parade passed them.

Presidents

Jack Ohle
Jack Ohle held the presidency of Wartburg College from 1998 to 2008, during which time a number of expensive construction projects were undertaken on campus, including the Wartburg-Waverly Sports Center. As a result of the spending, however, The Chronicle of Higher Education reports that Ohle left Wartburg in a state of financial unrest. This academic newspaper noted that the financing "has raised red flags with its accreditor, alarmed some faculty members, and left Wartburg with a credit rating just one notch above 'junk.'"

Darrel Colson
In 2015, Fitch Ratings "assigned a 'BB' rating to revenue refunding bonds issued by the Iowa Higher Education Loan Authority on behalf of Wartburg College", downgrading the college's financial rating. According to an article published in the College's campus newspaper, The Trumpet, Wartburg's credit rating is considered "speculative". According to Richard Seggerman, Wartburg's vice president for finance and administration, "[t]he debt comes from capital projects" including "the buildings and the equipment related to them ... the science center, the student center and The [Waverly-Wartburg Sports Center]", all projects originating during Jack Ohle's tenure as President of the College.

In October 2015, Wartburg made headlines for the dean of faculty's recommendation to reduce the college's faculty because of declining enrollment and the lack of "institutional need". In an article appearing in Inside Higher Ed, it was reported that declining enrollment and a large budget gap contributed to the recommendation. According to the article, "[t]he professors [whose positions were recommended to be cut] were notified their jobs were at risk by being copied on a memo to their respective chairs." The fact that the recommendations, if implemented, would leave the college without full-time professors in philosophy, ethics, American literature, theater, and French, led students to protest the cuts and created a concern about the perception that it may no longer be a liberal arts college after such measures.

List of presidents

 Georg M. Grossmann, 1852–1868
 John Klindworth, 1868–1875
 Georg Grossmann, 1878-1894
 Friedrich Lutz, 1894–1905
 Gerhard Bergstraesser, 1905–1909
 Friedrich Richter, 1894–1899 (Clinton IA)
 Otto Kraushaar, 1899–1907 (Clinton IA)
 John Fritschel, 1907–1919 (Clinton IA)
 Otto Proehl, 1919–1935 (Clinton IA)
 August Engelbrecht, 1909–1933
 Edward J. Braulick, 1935–1945
 Conrad Becker, 1945–1964
 John Bachman, 1964–1974
 William Jellema, 1974–1980
 Robert L. Vogel, 1980–1998
 Jack R. Ohle, 1998–2008
 William Hamm, 2008–2009 (interim)
 Darrel Colson, 2009–2022
 Rebecca Neiduski, 2022–Present

Location
Wartburg College has moved many times throughout its history:

 Saginaw, Michigan (1852–1853)
 Dubuque, Iowa (1853–1857)
 St. Sebald, Iowa (1857–1868)
 Galena, Illinois (1868–1875)
 Mendota, Illinois (1875–1885)
 Clinton, Iowa (1894–1935)
 Waverly, Iowa (1879–1933, 1935–present)

Athletics

Wartburg College teams participate as a member of the National Collegiate Athletic Association's Division III. The Knights are a member of the American Rivers Conference (ARC). Men's sports include baseball, basketball, cross country, football, golf, soccer, tennis, track & field and wrestling; while women's sports include basketball, cheerleading, cross country, golf, soccer, softball, tennis, track & field, volleyball, wrestling, and lacrosse. The women's lacrosse team competes in the Midwest Women's Lacrosse Conference (MWLC). In the spring of 2012, Wartburg's wrestling and women's track and field teams led Wartburg to become the only school in NCAA history to win two national team championships on the same day. Wartburg has had an individual or team national champion for 28 straight years including Wartburg Knights wrestling winning the 2022 NCAA DIII Wrestling Tournament. The men's wrestling team has a NCAA DIII leading 15 NCAA national titles. Wartburg's softball team appeared in two Women's College World Series in 1971 and 2003,  while the baseball team has also played in two College World Series, coming in 2000 and 2005.

Notable alumni 
Don Denkinger, Major League Baseball umpire who achieved notoriety for his call at 1st base as an umpire in the 1985 World Series
Romaine H Foege, member, Iowa House of Representatives, 1996–2008, director, Iowa Department on Aging, 2010-2011. CEO, Eastern Iowa Health Center, Cedar Rapids, Iowa, 2014-2015
Mark Holtz, radio announcer for professional baseball team the Texas Rangers
Dan Ige, professional mixed martial artist
Sarah Lacina, winner of season 34 of Survivor: Game Changers.  Appeared on three seasons of survivor and The Challenge: USA
Coleen Rowley, whistleblower FBI agent, researched suspected World Trade Center terrorist; jointly held the Time magazine Person of the Year award in 2002
Jack Salzwedel, chairman and CEO of American Family Insurance
Paul Schell, former mayor of Seattle, Washington
Brian Trow, businessman and television personality
George J. Woerth, Wisconsin state assemblyman
Tom Zirbel, professional bicycle racer and 2009 USA Cycling NRC points champion who signed to Union Cycliste Internationale professional team, Garmin-Transitions for the 2010 season
Chris Winter, current head football coach at Wartburg College
Matt Entz, current head football coach at North Dakota State
Bob Nielson, current head football coach at University of South Dakota

See also
 Wartburg Choir
 KWAR – Wartburg College's on campus radio station
 Old Main
 Rick Willis
 Bob Amsberry
 Chris Winter
 Eric Keller
 Dick Peth
 Joel Holst
 Jamie Mueller

References

External links
 
 Official athletic website

 
Waverly, Iowa
Liberal arts colleges in Iowa
Educational institutions established in 1852
Education in Bremer County, Iowa
Buildings and structures in Bremer County, Iowa
1852 establishments in Iowa
Private universities and colleges in Iowa